Matthew Lee Richards (born 26 December 1984) is an English former professional footballer who played as a midfielder or left back.

Career

Ipswich Town
Matt is a graduate of the Ipswich Town academy, and made his debut in the UEFA Cup against Avenir Beggen aged just 17. He received his only England under-21 cap for appearing in the England U21 victory over Ukraine U21 in August 2004. He played a prominent role in Joe Royle's Play-off semi-finalist making teams in 2003/04 and 2004/05. When Club Captain Jim Magilton was made manager in 2006–07, Richards found himself out of favour. Originally regarded as a left-back, he is now much more comfortable as a midfielder, either playing on the left or in the centre.

Brighton & Hove Albion (loans)
On 18 September 2007, Richards joined League One side Brighton & Hove Albion on a provisional one-month loan deal, although the Seagulls had allegedly been tracking the player all through the summer of 2007.

Richards' loan deal at Brighton was extended by a further two months, running up until 18 December 2007. He played 14 League games in total during his three-month loan at the Withdean and ex-Brighton manager Dean Wilkins expressed his interest on loaning the player until the end of the 2007/08 season. On 17 January 2008, it was revealed that Richards had agreed to join Brighton on loan for the remainder of the 2007–08 season.

Richards once again rejoined Brighton on loan until the end of December 2008 on 21 July 2008. He scored his first goal for Brighton in a 4-0 Football League Cup win over Barnet on 12 August 2008. In the following round he scored the winning penalty as Brighton knocked out Premier League side Manchester City in a shootout.

Return to Ipswich
Richards made his Ipswich return in 2009 under new manager Roy Keane starting against Cardiff in a 3–0 win at Ninian Park. This would turn out to be his last game for the club as he was released on 14 May 2009.

Walsall
Richards had a trial spell with Burton Albion scoring in a friendly against Ilkeston Town, however following a successful trial at League One side Walsall, Richards penned a two-year contract with the Saddlers.
Richards stated his desire to sign on at Walsall on Twitter, however, this was not possible.

Shrewsbury Town
Richards impressed during a trial period with Shrewsbury Town and underwent a medical at the Greenhous Meadow on 27 July 2011, with the deal expected to be completed in the following days. He signed a two-year deal with the Shropshire outfit on 28 July 2011, and scored his first goal in Shrewsbury colours on 8 October in a 3–2 home win over Barnet. The season finished with Shrewsbury earning promotion to League One with Richards playing in excess of 30 games and earning players, and fans player of the year awards.

Richards was released by Shrewsbury at the end of the 2012–13 season and joined Cheltenham Town on 5 July 2013.

Cheltenham Town
Richard joined League Two side Cheltenham Town on 5 July 2013. He scored his first goal for Cheltenham in a 3–1 defeat to Plymouth Argyle on 17 August 2013.

Dagenham & Redbridge
In August 2015, he signed for League Two side Dagenham & Redbridge on a one-year deal after impressing whilst on trial during pre-season. In May 2016 as his contract expired, he was released along with eleven players as Dagenham were relegated to the National League.

Later years
In November 2017, after a year out of the game, Richards joined Bath City of the National League South. On 23 March 2019, he joined Banbury United in the Southern Football League Premier Division. He left the club in late May, at the end of the season.

Career statistics

Honours
Shrewsbury Town
Football League Two: 2011–12

Individual
Shrewsbury Town Player of the Year: 2011–12
Shrewsbury Town Players' Player of the Year: 2011–12

References

External links

1984 births
Living people
Sportspeople from Harlow
English footballers
England youth international footballers
England under-21 international footballers
Association football defenders
Association football midfielders
Ipswich Town F.C. players
Brighton & Hove Albion F.C. players
Walsall F.C. players
Shrewsbury Town F.C. players
Cheltenham Town F.C. players
Dagenham & Redbridge F.C. players
Bath City F.C. players
Banbury United F.C. players
English Football League players
National League (English football) players
People with alopecia universalis